The SMC Pentax-DA 18-55mm f/3.5-5.6 AL lens is a standard zoom lens for the Pentax K-mount. It is often sold as a kit lens with Pentax digital SLR cameras and has a 35mm equivalent focal length of 27–82.5mm. Its optical formula is made of 12 elements in 9 groups. There are two variants of this lens:
SMC Pentax-DA 18-55mm 1:3.5-5.6 AL (first version of 18–55; LensType=252)
Samsung D-XENON 18-55mm 1:3.5-5.6 AL (Schneider Kreuznach branded variant; supplied with Samsung GX-series DSLRs; LensType=246)

A new optical formula (11 elements in 8 groups) was introduced in 2008 and exists in five variants:
SMC Pentax-DA 18-55mm 1:3.5-5.6 AL II (revised version with greater sharpness; LensType=229)
Samsung D-XENON 18-55mm 1:3.5-5.6 AL II (Schneider Kreuznach branded variant of revised 18–55; LensType=223)
SMC Pentax-DA L 18-55mm 1:3.5-5.6 AL (lightweight variant with plastic mount; LensType=222)
SMC Pentax-DA 18-55mm 1:3.5-5.6 AL WR (weather-resistant variant; LensType=218)
SMC Pentax-DA L 18-55mm 1:3.5-5.6 AL WR (weather-resistant but with lighter build with plastic mount; introduced with K-50; LensType=202)

All lenses except the DA L variants provide the Quick-Shift Focus System, providing full-time manual focus while in autofocus mode. The DA L variants also lack a distance scale and are sold without a hood. The hood for non-WR variants is PH-RBA52 while the hood for WR variants is PH-RBC52

External links

SMC Pentax-DA 18-55mm f/3.5-5.6 AL II
SMC Pentax-DA 18-55mm f/3.5-5.6 AL WR
Bojidar Dimitrov's Pentax K-Mount Page: DA 18-55/3.5-5.6 AL
Bojidar Dimitrov's Pentax K-Mount Page: DA 18-55/3.5-5.6 AL II
Bojidar Dimitrov's Pentax K-Mount Page: DA L 18-55/3.5-5.6 AL
Bojidar Dimitrov's Pentax K-Mount Page: DA 18-55/3.5-5.6 AL WR

18-55
Camera lenses introduced in 2008